Stono, also known as Jordan's Point (pronounced "Jer-don"), is a historic home located at Lexington, Virginia.  It was built about 1818, and is a cruciform shaped brick dwelling consisting of a two-story, three-bay, central section with one-story, two-bay, flanking wings.  The front facade features a two-story Roman Doric order portico with a modillioned pediment and lunette and a gallery at second-floor level. About 1870, a -story rear wing was added connecting the main house to a formerly separate loom house.  Also on the property are a contributing summer kitchen, ice house, and office.

It was listed on the National Register of Historic Places in 1975. It is located in the Lexington Historic District.

References

External links

Stono, Institute Hill, Lexington, Lexington, VA: 13 photos, 8 measured drawings, 7 data pages, and 1 photo caption page at Historic American Buildings Survey
Stono, Office, Institute Hill, Lexington, Lexington, VA: 1 photo and 2 measured drawings at Historic American Buildings Survey
Stono, Summer Kitchen, Institute Hill, At U.S. 11 and U.S. 11A, Lexington, Lexington, VA: 1 photo at Historic American Buildings Survey
Stono, Ice House, Institute Hill, Lexington, Lexington, VA: 1 photo at Historic American Buildings Survey

Houses on the National Register of Historic Places in Virginia
Houses completed in 1818
Houses in Lexington, Virginia
National Register of Historic Places in Lexington, Virginia
Historic American Buildings Survey in Virginia
Individually listed contributing properties to historic districts on the National Register in Virginia